Gol Afra (also Romanized as Gol Afrā and Gol Farā) is a village in Anzan-e Sharqi Rural District, in the Central District of Bandar-e Gaz County, Golestan Province, Iran. At the 2006 census, its population was 723, in 176 families.

References 

Populated places in Bandar-e Gaz County